Sean Kern is an American water polo player. His position is center forward (two-meter offense). During his water polo career, Kern was a four-time All-American, two-time National Player of the Year, two-time NCAA champion and three-time UCLA scoring leader. After his 1999 season, Kern was honored as the first-ever male recipient to receive the Peter J. Cutino Award. At the 2000 Sydney Olympics, he scored 3 goals for the US team.

He led Honolulu's Punahou School to three consecutive league titles and personally earned three Interscholastic League of Honolulu player of the year awards.(Honolulu Advertiser, Honolulu, Hawaii: 12/14/94, 11/29/95, 12/15/96)

Kern came to UCLA in 1997 as the top-ranked recruit in the country, taking the Bruins to back-to-back NCAA titles in 1999 and 2000. Kern missed the first eight games of the 2000 season while playing in the Sydney Olympics, but still led the Bruins to their second consecutive NCAA championship. He scored 33 goals in 17 games, and two in the NCAA final and was named the tournament's MVP for the second year in a row. Kern, a four-time All-American, was also chosen player of the year in the Mountain Pacific Sports Federation. Kern is a two-time recipient of the Peter J. Cutino Award, receiving the top American collegiate water polo honor for the first two years that it was awarded.

Kern joined other UCLA Bruins, Coralie Simmons (2001), Natalie Golda (2005) Kelly Rulon (2007), and Courtney Mathewson (2008), as the school's Peter J. Cutino Award winners, all coached by Adam Krikorian.

Kern now plays for the New York Athletic Club in the USA Water Polo Premier League.

References

External links
 
UCLA player bio

1978 births
Living people
Punahou School alumni
Water polo players at the 2000 Summer Olympics
UCLA Bruins men's water polo players
Medalists at the 2000 Summer Olympics
Olympic silver medalists for the United States in water polo